Xenopoclinus kochi, the Platanna klipfish, is a species of clinid found along the coast of South Africa, where it occurs on sandy substrates in the intertidal zone near to kelp beds at depths of from . The specific name honours the malacologist H. J. Koch, who collected the type while conducting conchological fieldwork,

References

kochi
Fish described in 1948